Destroyed in Seconds is a half-hour American television series that aired on Discovery Channel. Hosted by Ron Pitts, it features video segments of various things being destroyed fairly quickly (hence, "in seconds") such as planes crashing, explosions, sinkholes, boats crashing, fires, race car incidents, floods, factories, etc. The nature of the show closely resembles Real TV. The show uses real video of real events, and commentary explaining the destruction portrayed. Most videos have stock sound effects added. Some of the events seen resulted in fatalities, and all of the events have property damage.

Format
At the beginning of each episode, a compilation of all the incidents featured in that episode will play (though not in order), with Pitts narrating, "Without so much as a warning, life hangs in the balance. Human endeavour turns to chaos. And within seconds, nothing will ever be the same. Ever." On rare occasions, one incident will be left out of the opening compilation due to restricted space. That was the case for the Wichita City Hall drive-thru, which was not featured in the intro of episode 49. After the compilation, Pitts will describe two of the incidents that happen in the episode in one-liners. Each intro ends off with the phrase, "destroyed in seconds" before the show's main intro plays and the first incident in the episode. For example, episode 45's intro goes like this: "I'm Ron Pitts. Our team leaves no stone unturned in our search for destruction. In Italy, a Le Mans racer comes within inches of another car, as it cartwheels across the track. A military helicopter loses power and slices through the deck of a navy destroyer. A split second is all it takes for things to get destroyed in seconds. "

Each episode usually features eight or nine incidents, with a bonus incident at the end that is not part of the episode, but was lumped in by the crew for fun. The bonus clip usually involves car crashes or military disasters. At the beginning of each video shown, Pitts says the place, sometimes the time and date of the incident. Pitts will then explain the background of the incident (e.g. Racing competitions, industrial disasters), then the moment of the incident and what caused it. In the later episodes of the show, the location is sometimes not stated. This is likely because to give viewers an impression that the incident could have happened anywhere – across the globe or right down the street. Unlike Shockwave and World's Most Amazing Videos, there are no interviewees to talk about what happened in that incident. The incidents featured in the whole series happened before or during 2009, as the show was cancelled in 2010. At the end of each episode, Pitts ends off with a few words before the credits roll. The end credits usually review all the incidents that happened in the episode in order.

Usually, if a destruction is horrible, very dangerous, heart-stopping, or results in many injuries, the show usually goes into commercial either right at the moment of impact, right before it, or a little afterwards (for example, Jack Bland's brutal crash at Hagerstown in episode 8). When the show starts again, it reviews what happened and then explains what started the incident.

Episodes
Season 1 completed on March 23, 2009, and Season 2 in 2010. This is a list of Destroyed in Seconds episodes for Season 1 and 2:

References

External links

Discovery Channel original programming
2008 American television series debuts
2009 American television series endings